The Akaflieg München Mü23 Saurier is a two-seat motor-glider designed and built in Germany from 1956.

Development 
In 1957 the students at  Akaflieg München began the design and construction of the Mü23 Saurier motor-glider. Using the classic 'Munich School' construction technique, the Mü23 was built using fabric covered welded steel tube for the fuselage and wooden wings and tail covered with plywood and fabric. The pilot sitting directly behind the engine under a built up transparent canopy and the passenger sitting in a compartment under the centre section of the wing, similar to the seating arrangement of the Akaflieg München Mü10 Milan

Using the Mü Scheibe aerofoil section imbued the Mü23 with excellent low speed characteristics and short landings and takeoffs, but development was slowed by problems with the chosen engines, initially a Volkswagen VW1200, later a Braendle ZB700 and finally a Volkswagen VW1500N which gave satisfactory performance.

Once the performance of the aircraft could be guaranteed with the VW1500N engine, the  Mü23 took part in sailplane and motor glider competitions with some success. In 2010 the  Mü23 is undergoing restoration.

Specifications (Mü23 Saurier)

References

External links

 RC Groups, Photos and drawings of the Mü23
 RC Groups, Photos and drawings of a 5m Mü23 R/C model

Mu23
1950s German civil aircraft
Motor gliders
Single-engined tractor aircraft
High-wing aircraft
Aircraft first flown in 1959